Allen Branch may refer to:

Allen Branch (Doe Run Creek tributary), a stream in Missouri
Allen Branch (Fourche a Renault tributary), a stream in Missouri
Allen Branch (Troublesome Creek tributary), a stream in Missouri

See also

 Alan Branch, an American football player